Tai Tei Tong is a village of Mui Wo, on Lantau Island, Hong Kong.

Administration
Tai Tei Tong is a recognized village under the New Territories Small House Policy.

References

External links

 Delineation of area of existing village Tai Tei Tong (Mui Wo) for election of resident representative (2019 to 2022)

Villages in Islands District, Hong Kong
Mui Wo